Tito is a town and comune in the province of Potenza, in the Southern Italian region of Basilicata. It is bounded by the comuni of Abriola, Picerno, Pignola, Potenza, Sant'Angelo Le Fratte, Sasso di Castalda, Satriano di Lucania, Savoia di Lucania.

External links

 Official website

References 

Cities and towns in Basilicata